Móric Fischer de Farkasházy ((25 March 1799, Tata, Hungary – 25 February 1880, Tata) was a Hungarian porcelain-manufacturer; was one of the founders of the Herend porcelain manufactory in 1839.

He rendered distinguished service to Hungarian industry and art through his porcelain manufactory in Herend near Veszprém. He was compelled to struggle against innumerable difficulties before he succeeded in developing the small factory which he founded in 1839. It, however, became a veritable art institute, comparing favorably with the famous porcelain establishments of Sèvres, Meissen, and Berlin. It has been represented at a large number of international expositions by interesting and artistic exhibits, which were invariably awarded first prizes. The establishment is at present (1903) under the direction of Eugen Fischer de Farkasházy, a grandson of the founder. In recognition of the latter's services Franz Joseph I raised him in 1869 to the ranks of the Hungarian nobility.

His great-great-grandchild, Tivadar Farkasházy is a Hungarian humorist, author, and journalist.

References 
 
 http://www.mek.iif.hu/porta/szint/egyeb/lexikon/eletrajz/html/ABC03975/04499.htm (Hungarian)

1799 births
1880 deaths
People from Tata, Hungary
Hungarian Jews
19th-century Hungarian people
Purveyors to the Imperial and Royal Court
Hungarian nobility
Hungarian industrialists